Theodore Long may refer to:

Theodore Long, American former professional wrestler, referee and manager
Theodore E. Long American former president of Elizabethtown College, Pennsylvania

See also
Ted Long (disambiguation)